Saketh Myneni and Sanam Singh were the defending champions, but lost in the quarterfinals.

Egor Gerasimov and Alexander Kudryavtsev won the title defeating Riccardo Ghedin and Toshihide Matsui the final, 6–7(5–7), 6–4, [10–6].

Seeds

Draw

References
 Main Draw

Delhi Open - Doubles